Pterostylis maxima, commonly known as the large rustyhood, is a plant in the orchid family Orchidaceae and is endemic to south-eastern Australia. It has a rosette of leaves at its base and up to eight relatively large, dark brown flowers with transparent "windows" and a thin, dark insect-like labellum.

Description
Pterostylis maxima, is a terrestrial,  perennial, deciduous, herb with an underground tuber. Four to six stem leaves are wrapped around the flowering spike. The "head" end is swollen with two long bristles and there are up to 8 to 12 shorter bristles on each side of the "body". Flowering occurs from October to November.

Taxonomy and naming
Pterostylis maxima was first formally described in 1989 by David Jones and Mark Clements from a specimen collected near Bendigo and the description was published in Australian Orchid Research. The specific epithet (maxima) is a Latin word meaning "greatest" or "largest".

Distribution and habitat
The large rustyhood occurs in scattered populations south from Temora in New South Wales and across Victoria to the south-east bioregion of South Australia. It grows in woodland, open forest and mallee.

Conservation
Pterostylis maxima is described as "vulnerable" in Victoria and as "endangered" in South Australia.

References

maxima
Endemic orchids of Australia
Orchids of New South Wales
Orchids of South Australia
Orchids of Victoria (Australia)
Plants described in 1989